The Green Bridge of Wales is a natural arch formed from Carboniferous Limestone within the Pembrokeshire Coast National Park, Pembrokeshire, Wales. It is located in the  Castlemartin military training area just beyond the car park at Stack Rocks (Creigiau Elegig) and beside the Pembrokeshire Coast Path.

Geology

The geology of the area in which the Green Bridge of Wales is located is composed of a very thick layer of Carboniferous Limestone, including a certain amount of chert. Erosion has occurred over time as storm winds have battered the coast, pebbles have been dashed against the rocks, sand particles have worn away the surface, and chemical erosion has dissolved the limestone. The weakest parts of the cliff are the first to be worn away, usually the folds and small faults that are present in the rocks. This has resulted over many millennia in the creation of many unusual landforms. In the case of the Green Bridge of Wales, erosion has taken place on both sides of a small headland, caves have been formed which extended further and further until they met, forming the arch that can be seen today. Its outer edge rests on a more durable rock pedestal and its upper surface is clad in vegetation. The Green Bridge lost a considerable amount of rock to damage during Storm Ophelia in October 2017.

The Green Bridge
Like the nearby Elegug Stacks and Huntsman's Leap further to the east it is a popular visitor attraction and can be accessed by walkers from the Pembrokeshire Coast Path. Images of it appear frequently  both in tourism publications and in geography textbooks. With a height of around 80 ft, the Natural Arch and Bridge Society describe it as 'probably the most spectacular arch in the United Kingdom'.

The site lies at the extreme west of the eastern sector of the Ministry of Defence's Castlemartin military training area but access for the public is normally available.

References

Natural arches of Wales
Landforms of Pembrokeshire
Coastal erosion in the United Kingdom
Coast of Pembrokeshire